June Clayworth (born Esther June Cantor, June 9, 1905 – January 1, 1993) was an American stage and film actress.

Early years 
The daughter of Mr. and Mrs. David Cantor, Clayworth was born Esther June Cantor in New Jersey but raised in Wilkes-Barre, Pennsylvania. She graduated from Coughlin High School and studied at the Emerson College of Oratory in Boston.

Clayworth was chosen Miss Wilkes-Barre and represented the city in the Miss America 1927 pageant.

Career 
Clayworth gained acting experience in stock theater, including working in the Thatcher Stock Company of Scranton, Pennsylvania, and being the leading lady in the Hudson Players troupe at Scarboro, New York. Her Broadway debut came in Torch Song (1930); she also appeared in Page Pygmalion (1932) on Broadway.

She signed her first film contract with Warner Bros. Her film debut came in The Good Fairy (1935). Later, she worked for Universal and Columbia studios.

Personal life 
She was married to the producer Sid Rogell.

Death 
Clayworth died in Woodland Hills, California.

Filmography

References

Bibliography
 Keaney, Michael F. Film Noir Guide: 745 Films of the Classic Era, 1940-1959. McFarland, 2003.

External links

 
 
 

1905 births
1993 deaths
American film actresses
20th-century American actresses